Baby Animals is the debut album by Australian band Baby Animals, released in September 1991. The album debuted at number six on the ARIA Albums Chart and spent six weeks at number one, eventually going eight times platinum and becoming the highest-selling debut Australian rock album of all time (until the release of Jet's album, Get Born 12 years later). In October 2010, Baby Animals was listed in the book, 100 Best Australian Albums.

Track listing 
 "Rush You" (Suze DeMarchi, Dave Leslie, Eddie Parise) – 4:11
 "Early Warning" (DeMarchi, Leslie, Parise) – 3:57
 "Painless" (DeMarchi, Parise) – 3:42
 "Make It End" (DeMarchi, Steve Elson) – 4:09
 "Big Time Friends" (DeMarchi, Parise, Frank Celenza) – 4:54
 "Working for the Enemy" (DeMarchi, Leslie) – 4:32
 "One Word" (DeMarchi, Elson) – 3:58
 "Break My Heart" (DeMarchi, Parise) – 4:03
 "Waste of Time" (DeMarchi, Leslie, Parise, Celenza) – 3:38
 "One Too Many" (DeMarchi, Elson) – 5:08
 "Ain't Gonna Get" (DeMarchi, Elson) – 2:58

Personnel
Baby Animals
 Suze DeMarchi – guitar, vocals 
 Dave Leslie – guitar 
 Eddie Parise – bass 
 Frank Celenza – drums

Technical personnel
 Mike Chapman – producer, mixing 
 Kevin Shirley – engineer
 Rick O'Neil – mastering engineer
 Mario Vasquez – assistant engineer
 Rob Marinissen, Chrystene Carroll – photography

Charts and certifications

Weekly charts

Year-end charts

Certifications

References

1991 debut albums
ARIA Award-winning albums
Baby Animals albums
Albums produced by Mike Chapman